Satghara, is a town and union council of Okara District in the Punjab province of Pakistan.
It is located at 30°55'0N 73°31'0E with an altitude of 164 metres (541 feet)  and is also the location of the tomb of Baloch folk hero, Mir Chakar Rind. Many of his descendants as well as sub-tribes of Baloch descent predominate in the district.

Etymology 
The name Satghara is commonly believed to derive its name from the words saat (or seven) and ghara (or pitchers). Another narrative is that injured soldiers of Alexander the Great (from the ancient town of Stageira in Macedonia) resided there and they named the town Stageira, now corrupted as Satghara.

Mounds of brick debris at Satghara mark the site of an ancient town. Coins found at Satghara suggest that it was inhabited during the time of the Kushan dynasty.

References

Union councils of Okara District